The 2007 Golden Globes (Portugal) were the 12th edition of the Golden Globes (Portugal). It was held on 1 April 2007 in Praça de Touros do Campo Pequeno, and broadcast by SIC and presented by Bárbara Guimarães.

Winners and nominees

Cinema:
Best Film: Coisa Ruim, with Tiago Guedes, Frederico Serra and Paulo Branco
 nominated: 98 Octanas, with Fernando Lopes
 nominated: Transe, with Teresa Villaverde
 nominated: Viúva Rica Solteira Não Fica, with José Fonseca e CostaBest Actor: José Afonso Pimentel, in Coisa Ruim nominated: José Pedro Gomes, in Filme da Treta nominated: Marco d'Almeida, in 20,13 nominated: Rogério Samora, in 98 OctanasBest Actress: Isabel Ruth, in Vanitasnominated: Ana Moreira, in Transenominated: Carla Chambel, in 98 Octanasnominated: Manuela Couto, in Coisa RuimTheatre:
Best Play:   Music no Coração, a script by Filipe La Féria at Theatre Politeama
Best Actress: Maria do Céu Guerra (Todos os que Caem, by Samuel Beckett, enc. João Mota, at Theatre da Comuna)
Best Actor:  João Lagarto (Começar a Acabar, de Samuel Beckett, enc. João Lagarto, at Theatre Nacional D. Maria II)
Television:
Best Kiss: Luciana Abreu e Diogo Amaral (Floribella)
Best Hero: Fátima Lopes (Fátima)
Best Villain:  Mafalda Vilhena (Floribella'')
Fashion:
Best Stylist:         Miguel Vieira
Best Male Model:  Nuno Lopes
Best Female Model:   Elsa
Music:
Best Individual Performer: Sérgio Godinho
Best Group: The Gift
Sports:
Best Sportsperson: Vanessa Fernandes (Triathlon)
Best Coach:    José Mourinho
Best Football Player:  Cristiano Ronaldo
Award of Merit and Excellence:
 Herman José

References

Golden Globes (Portugal)
Golden Globes (Portugal)
Golden Globes (Portugal)
Golden Globes (Portugal)
Golden Globes
Golden Globes